Odonteus obesus is a species of earth-boring scarab beetle in the family Bolboceratidae.  It is found in North America.

References

Further reading

 
 
 

Bolboceratidae